Rhyda Ofori Amanfo (born 6 June 1997) is a Ghanaian sportswoman and a cricketer. She was appointed as captain of the Ghana women's national cricket team in 2015.

Education 
Rhyda is a graduate of Obuasi Senior High Technical School and Wesley College of Education.

Career

Cricket 
Rhyda is the captain of the Ghana women's national cricket team, her appointment came in 2015.

She made her Women's Twenty20 International (T20) debut for Ghana against Rwanda on 28 March 2022  in Lagos, Nigeria. Ghana placed fourth in the tournament.

Rhyda also captains Pomposo Royals, a senior women’s T20 League team in the Ashanti Region of Ghana.

See also 

 List of Ghana women Twenty20 International cricketers

References 

 https://m.facebook.com/story.php?story_fbid=pfbid02ZzMo5Set42JuTh7Khv4Jhoak3oY2FJ58dahkZSJi9u4XNha45BKemvAqtceBAXFsl&id=100063803285854

External links 

 Rhyda Ofori at ESPNcricinfo
  
 

Living people
Ghana Twenty20 International cricketers
Ghanaian cricketers
1997 births